Shortly after her Korean debut with "Audition", Younha released her first Korean album called The Perfect Day to Say I Love You on March 15, 2007 through YBM Seoul Records (currently known as LOEN Entertainment).

Track listing
"Delete" - 3:39
"Child - I Cry" ("꼬마 - I Cry"/"Kkoma - I Cry") - 4:11
"Password 486" ("비밀번호 486"/"Bimil Beonho 486") - 3:47
"A Perfect Day to Say I Love You" ("고백하기 좋은 날"/"Gobaek Ha Gi Joheun Nal") - 5:11
"Hello beautiful day" - 3:44
"Just Today" ("오늘만"/"Oneul Man") - 4:17
"Love Condition" ("연애조건"/"Yeonae Jogeon") - 4:28
"Fly" - 3:24
"Innermost Feelings" ("속마음"/"Sok Maeum") - 4:40
"Young Greed" feat. Wheesung ("어린욕심" feat. 휘성/"Eorin Yokshim" feat. Wheesung) - 3:43
"Alice" (앨리스) - 3:29
"Child - I Cry (Instrumental)" - 4:11
"Password 486 (Instrumental)" - 3:47

On June 26, 2007, a special edition of her first album titled Younha Vol.1 Repackage Album - The Perfect Day to Say I Love You was released. This edition comes with a photo book and three new tracks, one of which is a Korean version of her 2005 single "My Lover".

Track listing
"연애조건 (Remix)" (Love Condition)
"비밀번호 486" (Password 486)
"My★Lover (Korean Version)"
"Fly"
"Hello Beautiful Day"
"꼬마 - I Cry" (Child - I Cry)
"Delete"
"어린욕심"(Feat Wheesung) (Young Greed)
"속마음" (Innermost Feelings)
"앨리스" (Alice)
"고백하기 좋은 날" (A Perfect Day to Say I Love You)
"오늘만" (Just Today)
"비밀번호 486 (Instrumental)" (Password 486)
"연애조건 (Remix) (Instrumental)" (Love Condition)

2007 albums
Younha albums
Kakao M albums